Epping Secondary College is a secondary school located in Epping, Victoria, Australia. Education is provided for years 7–12 on one campus and offers VCE, VCAL and VET courses in years 11 and 12. The current principal is Bradley Moyle.

The school was founded in 1976 and built up in size slowly over the years. In 2019, the total student amount is 1277.

References

External links

Public high schools in Melbourne
Educational institutions established in 1976
1976 establishments in Australia
Buildings and structures in the City of Whittlesea